Kožuhe is a village in the municipality of Doboj, Bosnia and Herzegovina. It is first mentioned in the royal charter from 1446, in which Bosnian King Stephen Thomas Kotromanic grants this village along with several others to the Grand Duke Ivanis Dragisic.

References

Villages in Republika Srpska
Populated places in Doboj